Luciana Borio is a Brazilian-American infectious disease physician and public health administrator. She is a vice president at In-Q-Tel. She previously served as director for Medical and Biodefense Preparedness at the National Security Council, acting chief scientist of the U.S. Food and Drug Administration (FDA), assistant commissioner for counterterrorism policy of the FDA, and director of FDA's Office of Counterterrorism and Emerging Threats. She is known for her work advancing clinical trials, the development of medical countermeasures for health emergencies, and the public health responses to Ebola and Zika outbreaks.

On November 9, 2020, U.S. president-elect Joe Biden named Borio to be one of the 13 members of his COVID-19 Advisory Board.

Early life and education 
Borio obtained her MD in 1996 from George Washington University. She completed residency in 1999 in internal medicine at the Weill Cornell Medical Center and subsequently completed a combined fellowship in infectious diseases at Johns Hopkins University and critical care medicine at the National Institutes of Health. Borio continues to practice medicine at Johns Hopkins Hospital.

Career 
Borio is an infectious disease physician. Prior to joining FDA's Center for Biologics Evaluation and Research in 2008, Borio was senior associate at the UPMC Center for Health Security and assistant professor of medicine at the University of Pittsburgh (2003–2008). Borio served at the United States Department of Health and Human Services as an advisor on biodefense programs (2001 to 2008), where she implemented and managed mathematical modeling projects to assess the health effects of bioterrorism on civilians and to inform medical countermeasures procurement activities for the Office of Preparedness and Response. Before leaving her role as assistant commissioner of FDA, she approved a partnership in infectious disease research with the Bill & Melinda Gates Foundation.

In 2020, Borio was appointed by the Council on Foreign Relations to serve on its Independent Task Force on Improving Pandemic Preparedness, co-chaired by Sylvia Mathews Burwell and Frances Townsend.

Other activities 
 Codagenix, Member of the Scientific Advisory Board
 Goldman Sachs, Consultant

References

External links

 Luciana Borio Outlines the Evolving Role of the FDA in Developing Medical Countermeasures upmchealthsecurity.org

George Washington University School of Medicine & Health Sciences alumni
Living people
People from Rio de Janeiro (city)
American public health doctors
Brazilian emigrants to the United States
Food and Drug Administration people
Year of birth missing (living people)
United States National Security Council staffers
Johns Hopkins Hospital physicians
University of Pittsburgh faculty
Johns Hopkins University fellows
21st-century American physicians
21st-century American women physicians
COVID-19 researchers
Hispanic and Latino American women physicians
Members of the National Academy of Medicine
Women public health doctors